Eugongylus mentovarius is a species of lizard in the family Scincidae. It is found in Indonesia.

References

Eugongylus
Reptiles described in 1895
Reptiles of Indonesia
Endemic fauna of Indonesia
Taxa named by Oskar Boettger